Madison Seminary is a historic building in Madison, Ohio. Currently in private ownership, it previously functioned as a school, hospital, and as housing for the families of those killed in the American Civil War. It currently has notoriety as one of the most supposedly haunted places in Ohio.

In 1891, the building was purchased by the women's branch of the Grand Army of the Republic, and housed veteran nurses and female family members of fallen soldiers, for whom no provisions had been made following the defeat of the confederacy. The Women's Relief Corps, as they were known, built the western section of the building. The building was then donated to the state of Ohio when they could no longer afford its upkeep.

On June 30, 1962, the Ohio Department of Mental Hygiene and Corrections took over ownership of the building and evicted the civil war widows still living at the property. The new prison was called Opportunity Village, where female prisoners helped care for developmentally disabled or senile women from nearby hospitals. This project was shelved in 1975 when the county bought the property.

The property passed into private ownership in 1993, and remains on the National Register of Historic Places.

Supposed Hauntings

After the building fell into disuse, rumors began to spread that the property was haunted. The initial ad placed by the city when they sold Madison Seminary read: May Be Haunted. Since then the building has been the sight of numerous ghost hunts and has featured on Destination Fear and Most Terrifying Places in America.

Ghost hunters have reported receiving mysterious wounds from apparitions. Two frequently named ghosts are 'Steven', supposedly a child who went to live at the home with his mother after the civil war, and Elizabeth Stiles, a spy for the north who died at the home in 1898.

References

External links

Houses on the National Register of Historic Places in Ohio
Reportedly haunted locations in Ohio
1847 establishments in Ohio